Mesosa rosa is a species of beetle in the family Cerambycidae. It was described by Ferdinand Karsch in 1882.

Subspecies
 Mesosa rosa coorgensis Breuning, 1968
 Mesosa rosa rosa Karsch, 1882

References

rosa
Beetles described in 1882